In biblical studies, inclusio is a literary device based on a concentric principle, also known as bracketing or an envelope structure, which consists of creating a frame by placing similar material at the beginning and end of a section, although whether this material should consist of a word or a phrase, or whether greater amounts of text also qualify, and of what length the frames section should be, are matters of some debate. Inclusio is found in various sources, both antique and new. The purpose of an inclusio may be structural - to alert the reader to a particularly important theme - or it may serve to show how the material within the inclusio relates to the inclusio itself. An important case of this occurs in the Gospel of Mark's treatment of the "Cursing of the Fig Tree" and the "Cleansing of the Temple" (Chapter 11). By giving the first half of the story before the Cleansing of the Temple, and the conclusion after, Mark creates a "frame" that effectively highlights that he wants the Cleansing of the Temple to be seen in light of the Cursing of the Fig Tree - i.e. Jesus' actions in the Temple are not just a reform measure, but a judgment against it.

In the Hebrew Bible (the Old Testament)

While this may not be evident to many of the Bible's modern day readers, the Hebrew Bible is full of literary devices, some of which, having fallen out of favor over the years, are lost on most modern readers. Inclusio, of which many instances can be found in the Bible, is one of these, although many instances of its usage are not apparent to those reading translations of the Bible rather than the Hebrew source.

Particularly noteworthy are the many instances of inclusio in the Book of Jeremiah. A rather far-flung example of inclusio in the Book of Jeremiah can be found in its first section, chapters 1–24, which are enveloped both by a similar question in the first and last episode (1:11, 24:3), and by similar imagery—that of almond rods and baskets of figs. Inclusio may also be found between chapters 36 and 45, both of which mention Baruch ben Nerya, to whom Jeremiah's prophecies were entrusted. Bracketing can also be seen in The Lord's sayings in 1:10 and 24:6. Indeed, the whole book save for its last (52nd) chapter—which some claim was appended to it—can be thought of as inside the inclusio formed by 1:1 and 51:64, both of which mention the preaching of Jeremiah (דברי ירמיה), thus implying the lateness of chapter 52; although analyzing whether so trivial a measure has any meaning but that which appeases the eye is best left to the astute reader. None of this is to say that the shorter forms of inclusio—those in which the section enframed is quite shorter—are not found in the Book of Jeremiah. An example is found in Jeremiah 4:22, which reads:

The phrase "לא ידעו" (did not know) is found at the beginning and the end of The Lord's analysis of his people. English translations do not preserve this structure.

Inclusio also abounds in other books of the Bible. An obvious example of inclusio is found in the first and last (29th) verses of Psalm 118 "הודו לה' כי-טוב כי לעולם חסדו.". Another, more disputed, example may be found in the Book of Ruth, where one finds a certain resemblance, if somewhat chiastic, between 1:1 and 1:22—in the former Elimelekh leaves Bethlehem in favor of Moab, and in the latter Ruth and Naomi leave Moab in favor of Bethlehem. Finally, it has been suggested that Genesis 2 contains inclusio, for the male is created at the start of the passage and the female at the end, providing textual evidence for the parallels between the two.

In Rabbinic Literature

The rabbis of the Talmud were aware of occurrences of inclusio in the Bible, as shown by Rabbi Yohanan's comment in the Babylonian Talmud, Berakhot 10a that "Any psalm dear to David he opened with "Ashrei" ("happy is he) and closed with "Ashrei". Redactors of rabbinic document frequently made use of inclusio to mark off the endpoints of literary units of different sizes and possibly to suggest conceptual connections between seemingly disparate statements. At the end of the Mishnah, tractate Kelim, Rabbi Yose explicitly notes the phenomenon: "Happy are you, Kelim, in that you opened with [statements regarding] impurity and departed with [statements regarding] purity." Tractate Berakhot, which opens with a discussion of the laws of reciting the Shema Yisrael ("Hear O Israel") passage from Deuteronomy 6:4-9, concludes with a homiletic interpretation of the second verse from this passage (v. 5), showing how the ritual recitation of the tractate's opening may serve as a source of spiritual instruction at the tractate's end. The Mishna in tractate Nazir is framed by allusions to two famous biblical Nazirites - Samson (Nazir 1:2) and Samuel (Nazir 9:5), representing respectively negative and positive exemplars of this institution.

Many chapters of Mishnah are also framed by inclusio. In the opening mishnah of Taanit, Rabbi Joshua notes that rain on the festival of Sukkot is "not a sign of blessing", and the closing mishnah of the chapter notes that rainfall after the month of Nisan is "a sign of curse". This characterization of rainfall as God's way of communicating His blessings and curses is a central theme of the chapter. Sometimes the inclusio is based on a wordplay. Ohalot Chapter 7 opens with a discussion of corpse impurity in a "nefesh atuma" ("solid monument")and closes with the statement that a baby whose head has emerged from the womb may not be killed to save the mother because "ayn dochin nefesh mipnei nefesh" ("one soul may not be set aside in favor of another"). The use of the word nefesh at the beginning and the end of the chapter in opposite meanings, symbolizing respectively death and life, emphasize the interconnection between the mysteries of birth and of death.

Examples of inclusio may be found in later rabbinic literature as well. Tosefta Makkot Chapter 3 opens and closes with statements regarding the designation of three cities of refuge. Homilies regarding Isaiah 32:20 appear at the beginning and end of tracate Bava Kamma Chapter 1. The opening homily of Leviticus Rabba 29 asserts that the fate of Adam on the day of his creation is a sign for his children annually on the same date, and the closing homily of this section asserts that when Israel observes the commandments of this day God will regard them as having been created anew. Rabbinic redactors, following in the footsteps of their biblical predecessors, continued to employ inclusio as a literary marker and tool.

In the New Testament

The New Testament also uses inclusio. The main teaching part in the Sermon on the Mount starts and ends with the expression "the Law and the Prophets" (Matthew 5:17 + 7:12). Matthew's account of the first part of Jesus' public ministry is framed by an account on his teaching and his miracles (Matthew 4:23 +9:35). Also, Matthew's Gospel begins with the prophecy that Jesus' name would be "Emmanuel, that is, 'God with us,'" (1:23, in which the author has linked Isaiah 7:14 and 8:8, 10 together) and it ends with the promise, "I am with you always, to the end of the age". This forms an inclusio about Jesus in his relationship to his people that suggests his deity. The letter to the Hebrews uses Jeremiah's prophecy as an inclusio in 8:8-12 and 10:16-18. There are many more examples of this literary device in the New Testament.

References

Syntax
Literature
Bible content
Rabbinic literature
Rhetoric